City First Church (formerly Rockford First) is an Evangelical megachurch located in Rockford, Illinois. The senior pastor is Jeremy DeWeerdt.

History
City First Church was originally a small Swedish assembly that began meeting in a storefront hall on 5th Avenue in downtown Rockford in 1929.

In 1934, the name "First Assembly" is adopted during the pastoral ministry of Pastor Carl O'Guin.City First is a part of the Assemblies of God . Their claimed mission is four-fold; to evangelize the lost, worship God, disciple believers and to show compassion for others.

On September 12, 1971 a new location opened for First Assembly with a seating capacity of 1,200, at the corner of Spring Creek and Mulford Rds. First Assembly of God, under Pastor Eugene Whitcomb, opened Christian Life Elementary School in 1973. In the fall of 1974, Pastor Whitcomb and 5 other church-members were flying home from So. Dakota when the twin engine plane crashed over Albert Lea, Minnesota. Pastor Ernest Moen of 1st Assm. of God in Phoenix, AZ was called to officiate at the funeral and he later became the new Pastor with a 99% vote.

In 1975 Christian Life High School opened. Then in 1979, WQFL 100.9FM was purchased from Open Bible Church. (Rev. Don Lyon) In 1981, Christian Life Retirement Center was opened on N. Mulford near the church.

In 1986, the church begin the construction of a new building with a seating capacity of 3,650 persons. In 1993, Pastor Jeannie Mayo and Jeremy DeWeerdt launched the post high school group called Rockford Masters' Commission, which is now called City First Leadership College. 

In 2014, the attendance was 4,000 persons.

In December 2010, Rockford First was listed number 51 in the 100 largest Assemblies of God churches in the United States.

In September 2012, Outreach Magazine named Rockford First the 7th fastest growing church in the nation, with a 60% increase in weekly attendance between February 2011 – 2012.

In 2016, the attendance is 5,000 persons.

On January 29, 2017, Rockford First officially changed its name to City First Church because of the multiple locations, including Cape Coral, Florida and "God Behind Bars" at the Dixon Correctional Center in Dixon, IL and a new location at Hononegah High School opening on Easter Sunday, 2019.

Beliefs
City First Church is part of the Assemblies of God. The Assemblies of God claimed mission is four-fold; evangelize the lost, worship God, disciple believers, and show compassion.

References

External links
 City First Church

Assemblies of God
1980 establishments in Illinois
Evangelical megachurches in the United States
Churches in Winnebago County, Illinois
Buildings and structures in Rockford, Illinois
Megachurches in Illinois